The grey-rumped treeswift (Hemiprocne longipennis) is a species of bird in the Hemiprocnidae family. Currently, four extant species are placed in the family. Like the other members of the Hemiprocnidae, this species is closely related to true swifts, but unlike true swifts, the treeswifts are arboreal in nature, often seen perched on trees and high-tension power transmission lines, and on pylons. When perched, the wing tips cross over the tail. This species is commonly found in peninsular Malaysia, but has an extremely large range with limited information about the population trend,.

Description
Adult males have a distinct dark grey throat and chest contrasting with a white belly. Ear coverts are dull orange red/chestnut colored. Adult females lack the dull orange-red/chestnut coloration on the ear coverts. When perched, the wing tips cross over across the tail. Both sexes have a greenish sheen to the upper parts.

Distribution
It is found in Brunei, Indonesia, Malaysia, Myanmar, the Philippines, Singapore, and Thailand.
Its natural habitats are subtropical or tropical moist lowland forests, subtropical or tropical mangrove forests, and subtropical or tropical moist montane forests

Ecology and behaviour
The birds occasionally catch insects in flight by sallying from perches. They build nests on tree branches. The half-saucer-shaped nest is made from hardened saliva interspersed with feathers, mosses, and/or flakes of tree bark. The single egg is reportedly attached to nest surface with saliva. Owing to the fragile nature of the nest, it is attached only on one side to the branch. Thus, the bird does not sit directly on the nest for incubation. Similarly,  the parent birds reportedly  brooded by perching on the branch above the nest and fluffing their breast feathers out to cover it.

Both sexes help incubate the egg. During the shifting of parental care, the partner perches near the incubating adult and carefully slides over the nest.

References

grey-rumped treeswift
Birds of Malesia
grey-rumped treeswift
grey-rumped treeswift
Taxonomy articles created by Polbot